John XXIII College is a private Catholic secondary school, located in Cochabamba, Cercado, Bolivia. The school was founded by Fr. Enrique Conraets in 1964 in La Paz, and follows a work-study model. In 1969, the school with all the interns moved to Cochabamba and in 1971, the Jesuits took the administration of the school as the founder left for Belgium.

At the beginning, most of its students came from low-income families in mining towns. At the present time, the students still come from low-income families, but since 2007 the internship has been closed and the students come from the area between Cochabamba city and the little towns in the road to Oruro city.

Educational model 
John XXIII College is administered by the Society of Jesus and covers six years of secondary school and a technical degree in metal mechanics and electricity. It now follows the Fe y Alegría school model which originated in Venezuela in 1955. The Inter-American Development Bank assisted in funding the extension of this model to more schools in Bolivia. John XXIII graduates contributed to this effort. 

In 1986, during a Latin American Congress of Fe y Alegría in Cochabamba, John XXIII was named as a Latin American model of education for production. The school along with its utopian vision have been described as "little new Bolivia". 

John XXIII College uses a system of student self-government, with a student prime minister and other ministers, to enable students to experience democracy and to expand their social skills. 

Simon Education Foundation in 2007 initiated a Pilot Center for Technology Education in Cochabamba at John XIII that has served as a model for six other such centers in Bolivia; their first effort was training electricians.

Facilities include sports facilities, library, audio-visual rooms, informatics rooms and four technical formation rooms.

See also

 Catholic Church in Bolivia
 Education in Bolivia
 List of Jesuit schools

References   

Schools in Cochabamba
Jesuit secondary schools in Bolivia
Educational institutions established in 1964
1964 establishments in Bolivia